Romney, Hythe and Dymchurch Railway (RH&DR)locomotive No.1 Green Goddess is a 4-6-2 Steam locomotive build by Davey Paxman & Co. in 1925 and was given the works number 15469. It was one of two original locomotives ordered by Captain Howey and Count Louis Zborowski in 1924 and was completed and operation the following year, two years before the RH&DR was completed. The design was based on Sir Nigel Gresley's A1 class which is the class Flying Scotsman belongs to. Its livery was also based on that of Flying Scotsman as it was in LNER Apple Green. The designing of the locomotive was done by Henry Greenly and the total cost of building it was £1,250, or around £79,800 in 2021.

References 

Steam locomotives of Great Britain
4-6-2 locomotives
Railway locomotives introduced in 1925